Ellen Sprague Stager (26 May 1865 - 17 June 1951) was an American heiress and British peeress who was the daughter of General Anson Stager. She married Lord Arthur Butler, younger brother of James Butler, 3rd Marquess of Ormonde, who became the 4th Marquess of Ormonde of Ormonde in 1919. Ellen held the title Marchioness of Ormonde from 1919 until her husband's death in 1943. She was the mother of George Butler, 5th Marquess of Ormonde and Arthur Butler, 6th Marquess of Ormonde.

Early life

Ellen was born in Chicago on 26 May 1865 to General Anson Stager and Rebecca Stager (née Sprague). Her siblings were Louise Stager (1849 - 1923), Annie Stager (1851 - 1922), Mary Adelaide Stager (1853 - 1854), and Charles Wade Stager (1860 - 1867).

Anson Stager was a self-made millionaire, who started his career as an apprentice on the Rochester Daily Advertiser. He later found work as a telegraph operator, and received a series of promotions throughout the 1840s and 50's which culminated in his appointment as the first general superintendent of the Western Union Company in 1856. During the American Civil War Stager was asked by Governor Dennison of Ohio to manage telegraphs in Ohio and along the Virginia Line, which led to a later appointment as head of the Military Telegraph Department in Washington. He accompanied General McClellan during the West Virginia Campaign, and was credited with establishing the first system of field telegraphs during the Civil War. Stager retained his civilian status during the war, and in 1868 he was made a brevet Brigadier General of Volunteers.

In 1869 Stager moved to Chicago, and served as president of Western Electric, and later President of the Chicago Telephone Company and Western Edison Company, and had several business interests with ‘Commodore’ Cornelius Vanderbilt, who was the richest man in the world at the time; contemporary sources describe him as the ‘Chief Representative of Vanderbilt Interests in the Mid-West’. His time as President (and co-director) of Western Edison Light Co. likely bought him into direct contact with Thomas Edison, who also served as one of the company's Directors.

In 1879, the Stagers were recorded as living at 672 Michigan Avenue, Chicago. In 1880 Stager constructed a new home for approximately $150,000 on the corner of Michigan Avenue and Eighteenth Street in Chicago; this was reputed to be the first private home in the city to be lit with electricity. The building was erected on the former site of the Calumet Club, of which Stager had previously been president. The house was later sold in 1881 to William B. Howard.

Ellen's mother, Rebecca Sprague Stager died on 22 October 1883. She left an estate valued at $15,000, which included $12,000 worth of real estate in Cleveland, Ohio.

Anson Stager died on 26 March 1885. His funeral was held at his home at 1785 Michigan Avenue, Chicago on 28 March 1995; one of his pallbearers was Robert Todd Lincoln, the former US Secretary of War and son of President Abraham Lincoln.

Anson Stager's estate was valued at approximately $850,000, including $125,000 of real estate and $725,000 of personal estate. The terms of his will provided that his three daughters would share his estate equally. Ellen was to receive 25% of her share either upon reaching the age of 21, or upon her marriage. A further 25% would be transferred to her on her 30th birthday, and the final 50% would be transferred on her 40th birthday; however she was entitled to the income from the portions held in trust prior to her 30th and 40th birthdays.

Marriage Family 
In 1885, accompanied by her sister Annie Stager Hickox, Ellen departed the United States to visit Great Britain and Europe. She was presented to Queen Victoria at Court, and at a ball given in her honour she met Lord Arthur Butler, younger brother and heir presumptive of the Marquess of Ormonde. In the winter of 1885-86 she was recorded as visiting Pisa in Italy and Nice in France, and later visited Rome. She later visited the Ormonde Family Seat Kilkenny Castle in Ireland in 1886, and it was speculated at the time that this is where the pair became engaged.

Ellen and Arthur were married on 8 March 1887 at St George's Church in Hanover Square, London. She was given away by her brother-in-law, Ralph Hickox, and Arthur's younger brother Lord Theobald Butler officiated the ceremony. A Wedding Breakfast was hosted by Viscountess Maidstone (who was reported to be a friend of Ellen's) at her home at 17 Queen St, Mayfair. Arthur and Ellen honeymooned at Latimer House, Buckinghamshire, which was the home of Charles Cavendish, 3rd Baron Chesham. Lord Chesham's wife was a sister of Ellen's new sister-in-law, Elizabeth, Marchioness of Ormonde.

Arthur and Ellen had four children:

Lady Evelyn Frances Butler (20 December 1887 - 15 April 1978), married with Vice-Adm. Hon. Edmund Rupert Drummond, CB MVO RN (ret.), son of 10th Viscount Strathallan and brother of 15th Earl of Perth and has issue.
 Anne Drummond (b. 30 June 1911)
 Jean Constance Drummond (b. 20 August 1914) 
 James Ralph Drummond (b. 28 March 1918)
James George Anson Butler, 5th Marquess of Ormonde (1890–1949)
 James Anthony Butler, Viscount Thurles (b. 18 August 1916)
 Lady Moyra Rosamund Butler (b. 2 December 1920)
James Arthur Norman Butler, 6th Marquess of Ormonde (1893–1971)
 Lady Jane Butler (b. 9 January 1925)
 Lady Martha Butler (b. 14 January 1926)
Lady Eleanor Rachel Butler (b. 24 April 1894), married firstly Captain Edward Brassey Egerton and secondly William Henry Prior (known latterly as Lady Rachel Prior).

Dowry and Personal Fortune

The reported size of Ellen's dowry has varied between different sources. Newspapers on both sides of the Atlantic reported that Ellen bought a personal fortune of $1,000,000 (£200,000) to her marriage, and her name often appeared in newspaper articles listing various American heiresses who had married British and European Aristocrats. A conservative estimate of the income derived from a fortune of this size would be £8,000 to £10,000, dwarfing the £500 annual allowance Lord Arthur received from his brother Lord Ormonde. Modern sources record her fortune as ranging between $1,000,000 to $1,500,000.

However, Ellen's third-share of her father's $850,000 fortune upon his death in 1885 amounted to approximately $283,000 (or £56,600 per the exchange rate of $5:£1). When applying this figure to the terms of the Will, $70,800 (£14,160) would be paid to Ellen upon her marriage, and the income from the remaining $212,250 (£42,450) would not be transferred to her until this amount her 30th and 40th birthdays (which would occur in 1895 and 1905). Consequently, it seems more likely that at the time of her marriage to Lord Arthur, Ellen possessed a fortune closer in value to approximately $70,000 (£14,000) with an additional annual income of $8,500 (£1,700) to $10,500 (£2,100) from a remaining amount of roughly $212,000 (£42,200).

In 1897 the Chicago Tribune reported that Ellen enjoyed a $20,000 (£4,000) annual income from a $500,000 (£100,000) share in her father's estate, which included shares in the Chicago and other telephone companies. In 1915 Ellen settled £23,000 on her son George and his bride The Hon. Sybil Fellowes ($140,000 in US dollars at the time). As this would comprise nearly half of the fortune which she inherited in 1885, it is likely that the value of shares and other assets which formed part of Anson Stager's estate experienced significant growth between 1885 and 1915. Ellen settled a further £15,000 on George and Sybil in 1929 which was supplemental to the original marriage settlement.

In 1922, Ellen's sister Annie Stager Hickox died and left an estate of $847,207. As Hickox was a widow with no children of her own, much of her fortune was left to Ellen and her children. When adjusted for inflation, the value of this amount would have been approximately $490,000 in the year of Anson Stager's death, 1885.

Life in England and Residences

In 1891, Lord and Lady Arthur Butler were recorded as living at 21 Park Lane, City of Westminster, London, and at Sandleford Priory, near Newbury, from at least 1895 to September 1898. They took a temporary residence in Cadogan Square in 1898.

Their London residence was recorded as being 7 Portman Square from early 1900 until at least February 1925,; on 14 November 1925 it was reported that Lord and Lady Ormonde had arrived at 11 Bryanston Square, which was to be their new London address. 11 Bryanston Square remained as their London home until at least 1938.

In the 1901 UK Census, Lord and Lady Arthur Butler were recorded as living in Willesley House near Cranbrook in Kent, with their younger son Arthur and daughters Evelyn and Rachel, a Governess, Butler, Cook, two Footmen, a Kitchenmaid, Nurse, and three Housemaids.

In around 1909 Ellen seems to have purchased Gennings Park in Kent, which would be her home for the following forty-two years until her death in 1951. Gennings was later sold by her second son Arthur, 6th Marquess of Ormonde in 1955.
In 1910 Lord and Lady Arthur visited Lady Arthur's sister Louisa Gorton in Wheaton, Illinois.

The 1911 Census records Lord Arthur as visiting his daughter Lady Evelyn Drummond in Hove, Sussex. In contrast to her parents’ household, the census data in 1911 indicates that Lady Evelyn and her husband Lt. Drummond employed a Lady's Maid, Cook, Housemaid and Footman.

The 1911 census records that a Housekeeper, Kitchenmaid, Scullery Maid, three Housemaids, one Footman, one Under Footman, a Coachman, Groom and Chauffeur lived at Gennings.

According to the 1921 UK Census, Lord and Lady Arthur's household included a Butler, Footman, Pantry boy, Cook, Kitchen Maid, Scullery Maid, Nursemaid, two Housemaids and a Lady's Maid. A nurse and nursemaid, as well as their grandchildren James Anthony Butler, Viscount Thurles, and Lady Moyra Butler, were recorded as visitors.

In 1922, Lady Ormonde's sister Annie Stager Hickox died of pneumonia at her home ‘Villa Menesina’ in Monte Carlo, Monaco. Hickox also had a home at 78 Avenue Malakoff in Paris.

In 1925 a ‘Lady E. Butler’ was recorded as arriving in Adelaide, South Australia, aboard the Ormonde. This passenger's age was recorded as 60, martial status as ‘married’. This individual may have been Ellen; however by 1925 she held the title Marchioness of Ormonde; it was not uncommon for aristocrats and royalty to travel ‘incognito’ at this time.

Marchioness of Ormonde

Lord Arthur succeed to the Marquessate of Ormonde upon the death of his older brother James Butler, 3rd Marquess of Ormonde in 1919. As per the will of the Third Marquess, Ellen and Arthur's son George Butler, 5th Marquess of Ormonde inherited the bulk of the family estates in order to avoid double taxation, with an annual charge of £3,000 on the Ormonde Estates was made in favor of Arthur.

The decision to bypass Arthur as the beneficiary of the family estates seems to have been at the bequest of Arthur himself. Records survive of a letter written by the Fourth Marquess to Arthur's son George Butler dated 27 June 1916 outlining changes to his will which "your father has asked me to alter" which postponed Lord Arthur's use of the Ormonde Estate in favor of George, George's sons (at the time George's wife Sybil was pregnant with their only son, Anthony Butler) and George's brother Arthur and his male issue. Within the letter Lord Ormonde outlined several requests pertaining to family property, including that:

(1) George not make any alteration of the family seat, Kilkenny Castle, and shooting lodge, Ballyknockane Lodge, without consulting and obtaining the approval of Arthur;

(2) that Arthur would have use of Plate and other articles "as he shall desire"; and,

(3) that Ellen, during the lifetime of Lord Arthur, would have the use of any Family Jewels which Lord Ormonde had the power to dispose of.

The new Lord and Lady Ormonde continued to live at Gennings, and maintain their London residence at 7 Portman Square, and later 11 Bryanston Square, whilst Lord and Lady Ossory lived at Kilkenny Castle and leased various houses in London. Due to the declining estate income of the Ormonde Estates, wages rises and taxation increases, Lord Ossory made the decision to vacate Kilkenny Castle in 1935.

Whilst Kilkenny Castle remained as the family seat, the Ormonde's house at 11 Bryanston Square seems to have been the primary base in London for family events. The house loaned to Ellen's elder daughter, Lady Evelyn Drummond, for the wedding reception of her daughter Anne Drummond in July 1930. In June 1938 Lord and Lady Ormonde loaned their London residence to Lord and Lady Ossory for a large ball. This dance was a joint coming-of-age party for Ellen's grandson, Anthony Viscount Thurles, as well as a debutante 'coming-out' party for their granddaughter Lady Moyra Butler. The guest list reported in newspapers at the time provides some insight into the high social standing of the Butler family; among the notable guests who accepted invitations were the United States Ambassador Joseph P. Kennedy Sr. (father of US President John F. Kennedy) and his daughter Kathleen (later Marchioness of Hartington), The Earl and Countess of Airlie, Alexander Mountbatten, 1st Marquess of Carisbrooke (a grandson of Queen Victoria) and the Marchioness of Carisbrooke, Viscount and Viscountess Curzon, Earl and Countess FitzWilliam, Albert Spencer, 7th Earl Spencer and Countess Spencer (the paternal grandparents of Diana, Princess of Wales), the Duke and Duchess of Marlborough, Helen Percy, Duchess of Northumberland (who at the time was Mistress of the Robes to Queen Elizabeth), and the Earl and Countess of Shrewsbury.

Ellen was also recorded as serving on the Board of the West Kent Hospital in 1936 and 1937.

Taxation Court Case

Ellen was the appellant in a Court Case which was ultimately heard before Lord Finlay in the King's Bench Division of the British Courts. The case, Ormonde (Marchioness) v Brown (Inspector of Taxes) (1932) 17 TC 333, involved the taxation of income from a Foreign Trust. Particulars of the Case noted that in 1929 Ellen resettled her American property in an Ohio Trust, which was to pay her and her husband annuities of £6,000 each during their lifetimes. Ellen's appeal was successful.

Dowager Marchioness of Ormonde

Arthur, Lord Ormonde died on 4 July 1943, and was succeeded by his son George. Ellen continued to live at Gennings for the remainder of her life; however there is little evidence of her retaining a London residence after the outbreak of the First World War.

George, Lord Ormonde died on 21 June 1949, and Ellen's second son Arthur succeeded to the family titles. Arthur, Lord Ormonde, his wife Jesse and their younger daughter Lady Martha lived with Ellen at Gennings until Ellen's death on 17 June 1951. Her estate was valued at £61,704.

Titles

26 May 1865 – 8 March 1887:      Miss Ellen Sprague Stager

8 March 1887 – 26 October 1919:  The Lady Arthur Butler

26 October 1919 – 4 July 1943:   The Most Honourable Ellen Butler, Marchioness of Ormonde

4 July 1943 – 17 June 1951:      The Most Honourable Ellen Butler, Dowager Marchioness of Ormonde

See also
Butler dynasty

References

External links
 

1865 births
1951 deaths
People from Chicago
Ellen Stager
Marquesses of Ormonde